Abramović is a surname from Bosnia and Herzegovina, Croatia, Montenegro, and Serbia. It is a patronymic derived from the given name Abram. It may refer to:

Alen Abramović (born 1976), Croatian cross-country skier
Antonije Abramović (1919–1996), Montenegrin Orthodox Church religious leader
Boško Abramović (1951–2021), Serbian chess player
Domagoj Abramović (born 1981), Croatian footballer
Ivana Abramović (born 1983), Croatian tennis player
John Abramovic (1919–2000), American basketball player
Maria Abramović (born 1987), Croatian tennis player
Marina Abramović (born 1946), Serbian performance artist

See also
Abramowicz
Avramović

Serbian surnames
Croatian surnames
Patronymic surnames